Ambedkar Nagar is a monorail station on Line 1 of the Mumbai Monorail. It was opened to the public on 3 March 2019, as part of the second phase of Line 1.

References

Mumbai Monorail stations
Rail transport in Mumbai
A
2019 establishments in Maharashtra
Railway stations in India opened in 2019